Igor Łuczak (born 27 August 1972) is a Polish swimmer. He competed in two events at the 1992 Summer Olympics.

References

External links
 

1972 births
Living people
Polish male medley swimmers
Olympic swimmers of Poland
Swimmers at the 1992 Summer Olympics
Sportspeople from Łódź
20th-century Polish people